The 2012 Pacific hurricane season was an above-average year in which seventeen named storms formed. The hurricane season officially began on May 15 in the east Pacific—defined as the region east of 140°W—and on June 1 in the central Pacific—defined as the region west of 140°W to the International Date Line—and ended on November 30 in both regions. These dates conventionally delimit the period during each year when most tropical cyclones form in the northeastern Pacific Ocean. This year, the first storm of the season, Tropical Storm Aletta, formed on May 14, and the last, Tropical Storm Rosa, dissipated on November 3.

The season produced seventeen tropical storms; ten became hurricanes, and five further intensified into major hurricanes. Impact during the season was relatively minimal. In late May, Hurricane Bud paralleled the western Mexico coastline before dissipating, causing minor damage and but no reported fatalities. In mid-June, Hurricane Carlotta came ashore in Oaxaca at Category 2 hurricane intensity, making it the easternmost tropical cyclone in the basin to make landfall at hurricane intensity since 1966. The storm killed seven and caused $12.4 million (2012 USD) in damage.

This timeline includes information that was not released in real time, meaning that data from post-storm reviews by the National Hurricane Center, such as a storm that was not operationally warned upon, has been included. This timeline documents tropical cyclone formations, strengthening, weakening, landfalls, extratropical transitions, and dissipations during the season.

Timeline

May
May 14

1200 UTC (5:00 a.m.
May 15
The 2012 Pacific hurricane season officially begins.
0000 UTC (5:00 p.m. PDT May 14) – Tropical Depression One-E intensifies into Tropical Storm Aletta.
May 16
0000 UTC (5:00 p.m.
May 17
0600 UTC (11:00 p.m.
May 19
0600 UTC (11:00 p.m. PDT May 18) – Tropical Depression Aletta degenerates into a non-convective remnant area of low pressure.
May 20
1800 UTC (11:00 a.m.
May 22
0600 UTC (11:00 p.m.
May 24

0000 UTC (5:00 p.m. PDT May 23) – Tropical Storm Bud intensifies into a Category 1 hurricane on the Saffir–Simpson hurricane wind scale, becoming the first of the 2012 season.
1200 UTC (5:00 a.m. PDT) – Hurricane Bud intensifies into a Category 2 hurricane.
May 25
0000 UTC (5:00 p.m.
0600 UTC (11:00 p.m. PDT May 24) – Hurricane Bud weakens to a Category 2 hurricane.
1800 UTC (11:00 a.m.
May 26
0000 UTC (5:00 p.m. PDT May 25) – Hurricane Bud weakens to a tropical storm.
0600 UTC (11:00 p.m. PDT May 25) – Tropical Storm Bud degenerates into a non-convective remnant area of low pressure near the southwestern coast of Mexico.

June
June 14
0000 UTC (5:00 p.m.
0600 UTC (11:00 p.m. PDT June 13) – Tropical Depression Three-E intensifies into Tropical Storm Carlotta.
June 15

1200 UTC (5:00 a.m.
1800 UTC (11:00 a.m. PDT) – Hurricane Carlotta rapidly intensifies into a Category 2 hurricane.
2100 UTC (2:00 p.m.
June 16
0100 UTC (6:00 p.m.
0600 UTC (11:00 p.m. PDT June 15) – Hurricane Carlotta weakens to a Category 1 hurricane.
0900 UTC (2:00 a.m. PDT) – Hurricane Carlotta weakens to a tropical storm.
1200 UTC (5:00 a.m.
June 17
0000 UTC (5:00 p.m.

July
July 4
0600 UTC (11:00 p.m.
July 5
0600 UTC (11:00 p.m.
July 7

0000 UTC (5:00 p.m.
1800 UTC (11:00 a.m.
July 8
0000 UTC (5:00 p.m. PDT July 7) – Hurricane Daniel intensifies into a Category 2 hurricane.
0000 UTC (5:00 p.m.
0600 UTC (11:00 p.m.
1200 UTC (5:00 a.m.
July 9
0600 UTC (11:00 p.m. PDT July 8) – Hurricane Daniel weakens to a Category 1 hurricane.
0600 UTC (11:00 p.m.
1200 UTC (5:00 a.m. PDT) – Hurricane Emilia rapidly intensifies into a Category 2 hurricane.
July 10

0000 UTC (5:00 p.m. PDT July 9) – Hurricane Emilia rapidly intensifies into a Category 3 hurricane.
0600 UTC (11:00 p.m.
0600 UTC (11:00 p.m.
1800 UTC (11:00 a.m. PDT) – Hurricane Emilia weakens to a Category 3 hurricane.
July 11
0000 UTC (5:00 p.m.
1800 UTC (11:00 a.m. PDT) – Tropical Storm Daniel weakens to a tropical depression.
1800 UTC (11:00 a.m. PDT) – Hurricane Emilia re-intensifies into a Category 3 hurricane.
July 12
0000 UTC (5:00 p.m.
0600 UTC (11:00 p.m. PDT July 11) – Tropical Depression Six-E intensifies into Tropical Storm Fabio.
1200 UTC (5:00 a.m.
1800 UTC (11:00 a.m. PDT) – Hurricane Emilia weakens to a Category 2 hurricane for a second time.
July 13
0000 UTC (5:00 p.m.
1200 UTC (5:00 a.m. PDT) – Hurricane Emilia weakens to a tropical storm.
1800 UTC (11:00 a.m.
July 14

1800 UTC (11:00 a.m. PDT) – Hurricane Fabio intensifies into a Category 2 hurricane.
July 15
0600 UTC (11:00 p.m.
1800 UTC (11:00 a.m.
July 16
0000 UTC (5:00 p.m. PDT July 15) – Hurricane Fabio weakens to a Category 1 hurricane.
1800 UTC (11:00 a.m.
July 18
0000 UTC (5:00 p.m. PDT July 17) – Tropical Storm Fabio weakens to a tropical depression.
1200 UTC (5:00 a.m.

August
August 7
0600 UTC (11:00 p.m.
1800 UTC (11:00 a.m.
August 8

1800 UTC (11:00 a.m. PDT) – Tropical Storm Gilma intensifies into a Category 1 hurricane.
August 9
0600 UTC (11:00 p.m.
1800 UTC (11:00 a.m.
August 11
1200 UTC (5:00 a.m.
1200 UTC (5:00 a.m.
1800 UTC (11:00 a.m.
August 12
1200 UTC (5:00 a.m.
August 15
1200 UTC (5:00 a.m.
August 17
0000 UTC (5:00 p.m.
August 27
1200 UTC (5:00 a.m.
1800 UTC (11:00 a.m.
August 30

0000 UTC (5:00 p.m.
1800 UTC (11:00 a.m. PDT) – Hurricane Ileana attains its peak intensity with maximum sustained winds of 85 mph (140 km) and a minimum barometric pressure of 978 mb (hPa; 28.88 inHg).
August 31
1800 UTC (11:00 a.m.

September
September 2
0600 UTC (11:00 p.m.
1200 UTC (5:00 a.m.
1200 UTC (5:00 a.m.
September 3
0000 UTC (5:00 p.m.
September 4
0000 UTC (5:00 p.m. PDT September 3) – Tropical Storm John weakens to a tropical depression.
1200 UTC (5:00 a.m.
September 12

0600 UTC (11:00 p.m.
1200 UTC (5:00 a.m.
September 14
0600 UTC (11:00 p.m.
September 15
1200 UTC (5:00 a.m.
1800 UTC (11:00 a.m. PDT) – Tropical Depression Twelve-E intensifies into Tropical Storm Lane.
September 16
1800 UTC (11:00 a.m.
September 17

0600 UTC (11:00 p.m.
0600 UTC (11:00 p.m.
September 18
0000 UTC (5:00 p.m.
1200 UTC (5:00 a.m. PDT) – Hurricane Lane weakens to a tropical storm.
September 19
0600 UTC (11:00 p.m.
September 22
0000 UTC (5:00 p.m.
1200 UTC (5:00 a.m. PDT) – Tropical Depression Thirteen-E intensifies into Tropical Storm Miriam.
September 24
0000 UTC (5:00 p.m.
0600 UTC (11:00 p.m. PDT September 23) – Hurricane Miriam rapidly intensifies into a Category 2 hurricane.
1200 UTC (5:00 a.m.

September 25
0600 UTC (11:00 p.m. PDT September 24) – Hurricane Miriam weakens to a Category 2 hurricane.
1800 UTC (11:00 a.m.
September 26
0600 UTC (11:00 p.m. PDT September 25) – Hurricane Miriam weakens to a tropical storm.
September 27
1800 UTC (11:00 a.m.
September 28
0600 UTC (11:00 p.m.
September 29
0500 UTC (10:00 p.m.
1200 UTC (5:00 a.m.

October
October 6

1200 UTC (5:00 a.m.
1800 UTC (11:00 a.m.
October 7
1200 UTC (5:00 a.m. PDT) – Tropical Storm Olivia attains its peak intensity with maximum sustained winds of  a minimum barometric pressure of 997 mb (hPa; 29.44 inHg).
October 9
0000 UTC (5:00 p.m.
October 13
1200 UTC (5:00 a.m.
1800 UTC (11:00 a.m. PDT) – Tropical Depression Sixteen-E intensifies into Tropical Storm Paul.
October 15

0600 UTC (11:00 p.m.
1800 UTC (11:00 a.m.
October 16
1200 UTC (5:00 a.m. PDT) – Hurricane Paul weakens to a Category 2 hurricane.
1800 UTC (11:00 a.m.
October 17
0000 UTC (5:00 p.m. PDT October 16) – Hurricane Paul weakens to a tropical storm.
0600 UTC (11:00 p.m.
October 30
0600 UTC (11:00 p.m.
1200 UTC (5:00 a.m. PDT) – Tropical Depression Seventeen-E intensifies into Tropical Storm Rosa.
October 31
0600 UTC (11:00 p.m.

November
November 3
1200 UTC (5:00 a.m.
1800 UTC (11:00 a.m.
November 30
The 2012 Pacific hurricane season officially ends.

See also

List of Pacific hurricanes
Timeline of the 2012 Atlantic hurricane season
Timeline of the 2012 Pacific typhoon season

Footnotes

References

External links

 The National Climatic Data Center (NCDC)'s 2012 Annual Tropical Cyclones Report
 The National Hurricane Center (NHC)'s 2012 Tropical Cyclone Advisory Archive

2012 Pacific hurricane season
Pacific hurricane meteorological timelines
Articles which contain graphical timelines
2012 EPac T